Michael Elliott Langley (born 1961/62) is a United States Marine Corps general who has served as the commander of the United States Africa Command since August 9, 2022. He most recently served as commander of United States Marine Corps Forces Command, United States Marine Corps Forces Northern Command, and Fleet Marine Force, Atlantic from November 2021 to August 2022. He also served as deputy commander of Fleet Marine Force, Atlantic and before that as commander of United States Marine Forces Europe and Africa.

Langley is the first black four-star general in the United States Marine Corps, having been promoted to that rank on August 6, 2022.

Early life and education
A native of Shreveport, Louisiana, Langley graduated from the University of Texas at Arlington, where he majored in information systems analysis. Langley's father was a master sergeant in the United States Air Force, and as a child, Langley spent much of this time on racially diverse Air Force bases. He first experienced discrimination when his father retired from the military in the early 1970s and the family moved to a civilian neighborhood in Texas. His father, Willie C. Langley, retired when he was told he would be deployed overseas again, separating him from his children. He was the primary caregiver for his children after their mother's death.

At his confirmation hearing in 2022, Langley expressed his gratitude to his father, stepmother and two sisters: "As many nominees have said in testimony before me, military families form the bedrock upon which our Joint Force readiness stands," he said. "Without their support, I would not be here today."

Military career

Langley was commissioned as a second lieutenant in 1985. He commanded at every level from platoon to regiment – including Battery K, 5th Battalion, 11th Marines in support of Operation Wildfire in Western United States; battalion and regimental commands in 12th Marines forward deployed in Okinawa, Japan; and both the 201st Regional Corps Advisory Command-Central and Regional Support Command – Southwest in support of Operation Enduring Freedom in Afghanistan. 

As a General Officer, Langley's command assignments include Deputy Commanding General, II Marine Expeditionary Force (MEF) and Commanding General, 2nd Marine Expeditionary Brigade; Commander, Marine Forces Europe and Africa; and Deputy Commanding General, Fleet Marine Force, Atlantic and Deputy Commander, Marine Forces Command and Marine Forces Northern Command.

Langley holds a master's degree in national security strategic studies from the Naval War College and a master's degree in strategic studies from the United States Army War College.

Four-star general

In June 2022, Langley was nominated for promotion to general and assignment as commander of United States Africa Command. The nomination was confirmed by the Senate in August 2022, making him the first black four-star general in the 246-year history of the Marine Corps.

Awards and decorations

References

|-

Year of birth missing (living people)
Living people
Place of birth missing (living people)
People from Shreveport, Louisiana
University of Texas at Arlington alumni
Naval War College alumni
United States Army War College alumni
Recipients of the Legion of Merit
United States Marine Corps generals
Recipients of the Defense Superior Service Medal